V-Strom may refer to:

Suzuki V-Strom 250, motorcycle
Suzuki V-Strom 650, motorcycle
Suzuki V-Strom 1000, motorcycle
Suzuki V-Strom 1050, motorcycle